Lake of the Twin Fawns also called "Duck Pond" is a small lake in Otsego County, New York. It is located northwest of Laurens within Gilbert Lake State Park. Lake of the Twin Fawns either drains west via an unnamed creek which flows into Stony Creek or south via Lake Brook which flows into Gilbert Lake.

References 

Twin Fawns
Twin Fawns